Coronavirus in South Korea may refer to:
2015 Middle East respiratory syndrome outbreak in South Korea, coronavirus outbreak which affected South Korea in 2015
COVID-19 pandemic in South Korea, coronavirus outbreak which affected South Korea from 2020